Stellantis North America, more commonly known as Chrysler, operates proving grounds around North America for development and validation testing of new vehicles.

Arizona Proving Ground (Yucca, Arizona)
Location:

The Arizona Proving Ground is a vehicle test facility established in 1955 in Yucca, Arizona. It was owned and operated by Ford Motor Company based in Dearborn, Michigan, until Chrysler LLC announced on November 2, 2007 that it had purchased the facility for $34.9 million. APG is located at the foot of the Hualapai Mountains near Yucca, Arizona, 120 miles (200 km) southeast of Las Vegas, situated between Lake Havasu and Kingman, Arizona.

The facility was originally Yucca Army Airfield, an Army Air Corps training base, used during World War II. The field was declared surplus land by 1946 and the ownership was turned over to Ford in 1954.

Harley-Davidson Motor Company has entered into an agreement to use the vehicle test facility to test their motorcycles.  Harley-Davidson currently occupies several buildings at the test facility, including at least one they custom built.

Features
It includes a five-mile (8 km) high speed banked oval track, with a myriad of other road testing surfaces.

Details about the facility:
An  vehicle dynamics area
A water ingestion test area
Vehicle corrosion test chambers
Special test roads/surfaces for vehicle durability testing
A water leak test facility
A low friction facility suitable for ABS system testing
Light truck structural durability
Accelerated vehicle corrosion testing
Car and truck thermal management
Hot fuel and octane testing
Splash testing/water ingestion testing
FMVSS brake certification for car and light truck
Tire traction testing for car and light truck
Elevation - 1,950 feet (590 m)
Average maximum summer temperature - 103 °F (39 °C)
Average minimum winter temperature - 32 °F (0 °C)
Average annual precipitation - 6.4 inches (160 mm)

Chelsea Proving Grounds (Chelsea, Michigan)
Location:

Details about the facility:
The facility covers an area of 
Sled-impact testing site
Covered crash barrier
Skid traction area
Mileage accumulators
Emissions certification Center
Wind tunnel
Corrosion testing facility
Curb hit testing
32% grade and 15% grade
New "spaghetti" road being constructed

Florida Evaluation Center (Naples, Florida)

Location:

Stats: 530 acres (2.1 km²), 6.2 miles (10 km) of roads

Major facilities: Straightaway, lane change area, handling course, sound test area 

Major testing: Warm weather performance and handling

This facility has been taken over by Chrysler in early 2013 with Harley-Davidson leasing parts of the facility

Former Facilities

Arizona Proving Ground (Wittmann, Arizona)

Location:

The facility also includes an area to test sun exposure on vehicles and components, a city traffic course, a corrosion-preparation facility and access to mountain grades.

This facility is being retired as it has been sold to home builders / land developers.

According to MacRumors Apple bought this proving ground, north west of Phoenix, in 2021 to test Apple cars.

External links
 http://www.chryslerllc.com/pdf/about_us/Global_Facilities.pdf
 http://www.allpar.com/corporate/chelsea-proving-grounds.html
 http://www.chryslertestservices.com/services More Chrysler Proving Grounds Info

References

Chrysler
Road test tracks by manufacturer